Brimfield may refer to:

United Kingdom
 Brimfield, Herefordshire, England

United States
 Brimfield Township, Peoria County, Illinois
 Brimfield, Illinois, a village within the township
 Brimfield High School
 Brimfield, Indiana
 Brimfield, Massachusetts
 Brimfield State Forest
 Brimfield Township, Portage County, Ohio
 Brimfield (CDP), Ohio, a census-designated place within the township